Kunzea phylicoides, commonly known as the slender burgan, is a flowering plant in the myrtle family, Myrtaceae and is endemic to south-eastern Australia. It is an erect shrub with drooping branches, fibrous or corky bark, bright green, narrow leaves and clusters of white flowers in spring.

Description
There are no bracts or bracteoles at the base of the flower.

Kunzea phylicoides is similar K. ericoides but has a more graceful habit, leafy groups of flowers and about twice as many stamens. It sometimes hybridises with K. peduncularis.

Taxonomy and naming
Slender burgan was first formally described in 1843 by Johannes Conrad Schauer after an unpublished description by Allan Cunningham who gave it the name Baeckea phylicoides. The description was published in Wilhelm Walpers's Repertorium Botanices Systematicae. In 1917, George Claridge Druce changed the name to Kunzea phylicoides. The specific epithet (phylicoides) refers to a similarity of this species to others in the genus Phylica. The ending -oides is a Latin suffix meaning "like", "resembling" or "having the form of".

Distribution
Kunzea phylicoides  grows along the Snowy River and its tributaries in New South Wales, the Australian Capital Territory and Victoria.

References

phylicoides
Flora of New South Wales
Flora of Victoria (Australia)
Flora of the Australian Capital Territory
Myrtales of Australia
Plants described in 1843